The 2005 Milwaukee Brewers season was the 36th season for the Brewers in Milwaukee, the 8th in the National League, and 37th overall. They finished the season in third place in the National League Central Division. This was also the Brewers’ first non-losing season since 1992.

Offseason
December 13, 2004: Scott Podsednik was traded by the Milwaukee Brewers with a player to be named later and Luis Vizcaíno to the Chicago White Sox for Carlos Lee. The Milwaukee Brewers sent Travis Hinton (minors) (January 10, 2005) to the Chicago White Sox to complete the trade.
January 21, 2005: Ricky Bottalico was signed as a free agent with the Milwaukee Brewers.
March 29, 2005: Brooks Kieschnick was released by the Milwaukee Brewers.

Regular season

Opening Day starters
Russell Branyan
Brady Clark
Doug Davis
J. J. Hardy
Geoff Jenkins
Carlos Lee
Damian Miller
Lyle Overbay
Junior Spivey

Season standings

National League Central

Record vs. opponents

Transactions
May 27, 2005: Tim Crabtree was released by the Milwaukee Brewers.
July 27, 2005: Ricky Bottalico was released by the Milwaukee Brewers.

Roster

Player stats

Batting
Note: G = Games played; AB = At bats; R = Runs; H = Hits; 2B = Doubles; 3B = Triples; HR = Home runs; RBI = Runs batted in; SB = Stolen bases; BB = Walks; AVG = Batting average; SLG = Slugging average

Source:

Pitching
Note: W = Wins; L = Losses; ERA = Earned run average; G = Games pitched; GS = Games started; SV = Saves; IP = Innings pitched; H = Hits allowed; R = Runs allowed; ER = Earned runs allowed; BB = Walks allowed; SO = Strikeouts

Source:

Awards and records
2005 Major League Baseball All-Star Game
 Carlos Lee, outfield, reserve

Farm system

The Brewers' farm system consisted of six minor league affiliates in 2005. The Nashville Sounds won the Pacific Coast League championship.

Game log

References

2005 Milwaukee Brewers team at Baseball-Reference
2005 Milwaukee Brewers team page at baseball-almanac.com

Milwaukee Brewers seasons
Milwaukee Brewers Season, 2005
Milwaukee Brew